Guayaquil Municipal Museum is a museum in Guayaquil, Ecuador. It contains artifacts, objects and historical items relating to the history of Guayaquil. It is considered the most important of the city and one of the best in the country. It is located in the center of the city of Guayaquil, in the same building as the Municipal Library.
Admission is free, but passports are required.

The museum has its origins in 1863 when an industrial museum was started by the politician and writer Pedro Carbo Noboa, making it the oldest in Ecuador, but it was not until 1908 that the museum was officially founded. The first director was Camilo Destruge Illingworth. The museum has gone through a variety of moves and renovations, acquiring its own building for the first time in 1916.

The museum's website outlines the following rooms:

 Pre-Hispanic Room: ceramic, metal, and stone objects and handicrafts from the Valdivia, Machalilla and Chorrera cultures 
 Colonial Room: includes Spanish firearms, a diorama from the old church of Santo Domingo, the layouts of Guayaquil traced between 1170 and 1772 by Francisco Requena and Ramon Garcia de Leon y Pizarro, and a scale model of the city made by architect Parsival Castro according to a sketch made in 1858 by Manuel Villavicencio"
 Religious Art Room: "an exhibition of mystic scenes comprised by religious paintings from the churches of Guayaquil; icons and archetypes of sacred art, and sculptures crafted by colonial artists like Diego Robles"
 Numismatic Room: coins, particularly the barter system

The museum also has a collection of tsantsas, or shrunken heads.

References

Museums in Ecuador
Buildings and structures in Guayaquil
Museums established in 1908
1908 establishments in Ecuador